Buprenorphine-3-glucuronide (B3G) is a major active metabolite of the opioid modulator buprenorphine. It has affinity for the μ-opioid receptor (Ki = 4.9 (± 2.7) pM), δ-opioid receptor (Ki = 270 nM), and nociceptin receptor (Ki = 36 μM), but not for the κ-opioid receptor. Whether B3G acts as an agonist or antagonist of each of the former three respective sites has yet to be determined. In rats, at the doses assayed, B3G has been found to produce a small degree of antinociception, and similarly to buprenorphine in these assays, has not been found to produce sedation, reduce locomotion, or decrease respiratory rate. Of all of the active metabolites of buprenorphine, B3G is thought to be the most similar to the parent drug. Unlike norbuprenorphine, but similarly to buprenorphine (and norbuprenorphine-3-glucuronide), B3G is not a substrate for P-glycoprotein, and hence may cross the blood-brain-barrier significantly.

See also
 Morphine-3-glucuronide

References

Opioid metabolites
4,5-Epoxymorphinans
Catechol ethers
Tertiary alcohols
Secondary alcohols
Oripavines
Glucuronide esters